Coelotrypes fasciolatus is a species of tephritid or fruit flies in the genus Coelotrypes of the family Tephritidae.

References

Trypetinae